Alesiya Charnyovskaya (born 23 January 1978) is a Belarusian taekwondo practitioner.

References

1978 births
Living people
Belarusian female taekwondo practitioners
Universiade medalists in taekwondo
Universiade silver medalists for Belarus
Universiade bronze medalists for Belarus
European Taekwondo Championships medalists
World Taekwondo Championships medalists
Medalists at the 2003 Summer Universiade
Medalists at the 2005 Summer Universiade
21st-century Belarusian women